Juan Felipe Solís Arboleda (born 5 March 1999) is a Colombian weightlifter, competing in the 85 kg category until 2018 and 81 kg starting in 2018 after the International Weightlifting Federation reorganized the categories.

Career
He competed at the 2019 Pan American Weightlifting Championships in the 81 kg division winning a bronze medal. Later in 2019 he competed at the 2019 Junior World Weightlifting Championships winning a silver medal in the snatch, gold medal in the clean & jerk and silver in the total, finishing 1 kg behind gold medalist Ritvars Suharevs.

In February 2020, he was provisionally suspended after testing positive for the anabolic steroid boldenone. In December 2020, the International Weightlifting Federation confirmed his four-year ban from the sport.

References

1999 births
Living people
Colombian male weightlifters
Colombian sportspeople in doping cases
Doping cases in weightlifting
21st-century Colombian people